Wasawasa is a popular dish, eaten in Dagbon and other parts of Northern Ghana. It is also eaten in some West African countries, such as Burkina Faso. It is made from dried yam peelings called jaling, which have been grounded into flour and steamed. Wasawasa is mostly eaten with spicy sauces and sometimes garnished with vegetables, accompanied with shea butter or raw groundnut oil and fried fish. Wasawasa is sometimes served with beans, pasta, and salad.

Ingredients for Wasawasa 
There are a variety of ingredients that can be used to prepare Wasawasa dish though these ingredients may be dependent on the choices of the beneficiaries but the most common or primary ingredients include; yam flour, salt, freshly ground pepper, water for steaming, onions, groundnut or shea butter oil.
It's cooked with a chamber pot and steamed until it's ready. It usually turns black after cooking.

Health Benefits 
It provides Carbohydrates and proteins to the body.
It equally gives vitamins and roughages because of its accompanied vegetables like cabbages, carrots and sliced potatoes.

References

External links 

 How to prepare Wasawasa

West African cuisine
Ghanaian cuisine
Burkinabé cuisine